Herbert Gray may refer to:
 Herbert Gray (Irish priest), Archdeacon of Leighlin
 Herbert Branston Gray, English clergyman and schoolmaster
 Herb Gray, Canadian politician
 Herb Gray (Canadian football)